Faruk Mercan (born 1971) is a Turkish journalist and writer. He is a journalist for Aksiyon and the author of a number of books on the Turkish deep state, including books on Üzeyir Garih, Nesim Malki and the Susurluk scandal. He has worked at Dünya Radyo and the Zaman newspaper.

Mercan graduated from Ankara University, Law School in 1993.

Books
 Fethullah Gülen (2008), Doğan Kitap
 Niso, Nesim Malki Cinayeti (2007), Doğan Kitap
 Boğazın Şövalyesi, Üzeyir Garih Cinayeti (2007), Doğan Kitap
 Onlar Başroldeydi (2007), Doğan Kitap
 Savaşçının Dönüşü (2006)
 Apolet, Kılıç ve İktidar (2004)
 Susurluk Prensleri, Bir Gizli Savaşın Perde Arkası (1999)
 Üzeyir Garih'in Son Randevusu (2002)
 Niso: Nesim Malki'nin Sıradışı Hikâyesi (2001)

References 

1971 births
Living people
Turkish journalists
Ankara University Faculty of Law alumni
Turkish writers
Zaman (newspaper) people